Bulykin (masculine) or Bulykina (feminine) is a Russian surname that may refer to:

 Dmitri Bulykin (born 1979), Russian football player
 Oleg Bulykin, Soviet volleyball player, father of Dmitri
 Philipp Bulykin (1902–1974), Soviet counter-admiral, main navigator of the USSR Navy headquarters

Russian-language surnames